A baby boom is a period marked by a significant increase of birth rate. This demographic phenomenon is usually ascribed within certain geographical bounds of defined national and cultural populations. People born during these periods are often called baby boomers. The cause of baby booms involves various fertility factors. The best-known baby boom occurred in the mid-twentieth century, sometimes considered to have started after the end of the Second World War, sometimes from the late 1930s, and ending in the 1960s.

Africa

"According to the new UNICEF report, almost 2 billion babies will be born in Africa between 2015 and 2050 and the 2 main driving forces behind this surge in births and children are continued high fertility rates and rising numbers of women able to have children of their own."

By 2050, Africa is predicted to account for about 55% of all births in the world, 40% of all children under the age of five, and 37% of all children worldwide (under 18). Africa will become more crowded as its population continues to grow, considering the continent is predicted to grow from 8 people per square kilometer in 1950 to 39 in 2015, and to around 80 by the middle of the century. 

The HIV/AIDS crisis in Africa has contributed to a population boom. Aid money used for contraception has been diverted since the start of the AIDS crisis in Africa into fighting HIV, which led to far more births, than deaths from AIDS.

Africa accounted for one out of every nine births in the world in 1950. It is predicted that they will account for approximately one in every three global births by the year 2030. Africa would account for almost half of all births by the end of the century.

Canada

Indigenous people in Canada 

Until the 1960s, the Aboriginal population rose steadily. The child mortality rate started to decline steadily in the 1960s, due to the increased access to health care. Throughout the 1960s, the fertility rate remained high, resulting in the Aboriginal baby boom peaking in 1967 – about ten years after the postwar baby boom in Canada. 

While Aboriginal fertility has remained higher than the overall Canadian birth rate, it has decreased from four times in the 1960s to one-and-a-half times today. However, demographic change was just a part of the reason for the increase in Aboriginal population in the last half of the century.

Appearance of Generation "X," "Y," and "Z" in Canada 
Generation X refers to the birth rate decline after the mid-20th century baby boom. Author Douglas Coupland, who coined the term Generation X, defined it as children born 1960 and after. High unemployment and uneven income distribution welcomed Generation X, giving them little opportunity to produce the next baby boom.

In 2011, the children of baby boomers made up 27% of the total population; this category was called Generation Y, or the "baby boom echo." The fertility rate of the generations after the baby boomers dropped as a result of demographic changes such as increasing divorce and separation rates, female labour force participation, and rapid technological change. 

The echo generation's children, known as Generation Z, are people born after 1993, or after the invention of the Internet, making up over 7.3 million people in Canada born between 1993 and 2011.

Israel 
Israel has been in a constant baby boom since independence, with the highest fertility rate in the OECD at 3.1 children per woman. In addition to having the highest fertility rate among developed nations, it is the only developed country to have never had a sub-replacement fertility rate. Israel's baby boom began in 1947, a year before independence, when the fertility rate among the Yishuv, or Jewish population of what was then Mandatory Palestine, began to rise dramatically as a result of the aftereffects of the Holocaust and expectations of Jewish independence.

Japan

First baby boom 
In Japan, the first baby boom occurred between 1947 and 1949. The number of births in this period exceeded 2.5 million every year, bringing the total number of births to about 8 million. The 2.69 million births in 1949 are the most ever in postwar statistics. The cohort born in this period is called the "baby boom generation" (団塊の世代, dankai no sedai, means "the generation of nodule").

Second baby boom 
A period of more than two million annual births from 1971 to 1974, with the number of births in 1973 peaking at 2.09 million, is referred to as the second baby boom. However, unlike the first boom, this increase in the number of births is an increase in the number of births not accompanied by an increase in the total fertility rate. The people born during this period are often called "baby boom juniors" (団塊ジュニア, dankai junia, means "the juniors of the generation of nodule").

The rate of births has been declining since the second baby boom.

Romania
 Decreței: (1967–1989), A ban on abortion and contraception caused a baby boom in Romania, leading to overcrowded hospitals. According to an article in the Chicago Tribune on December 26, 1967, a doctor had to beg a woman to give birth at home due to overcrowding at the hospital. The article also said that "pregnant women were having to share hospital beds, and sickly babies were being put into oxygen tents in groups." The baby boom in Romania caused problems that began affecting the health of the nation. Before its ban in 1967, abortion was the only form of birth control. The ethno-nationalistic policies of Romania's leader, Nicolae Ceaușescu, further contributed to the baby boom. To encourage people in dominant ethnic groups to have more children, the Romanian Government established financial incentives to have children, including a tax for anyone over 25 without a child. This motivated many people to have children at a younger age, and with ethnic Romanian partners, leading to a surge in births, which later dropped to 14.3 births per 1000 individuals by the 1980s. In an effort to increase birth rates, Ceaușescu changed the legal age to marry to 15, launched media campaigns, and mandated monthly gynecological examinations of all women of childbearing age. This caused a near-fivefold increase in spending on incentives, but the birth rate decreased by 40%.

United States

The term "baby boom" is often used to refer specifically to the post–World War II (1946–1964) baby boom in the United States and Europe. In the US the number of annual births exceeded 2 per 100 women (or approximately 1% of the total population size). An estimated 78.3 million Americans were born during this period.

Since the beginning of the 20th century there were several baby booms:
 Post–World War I baby boom: (1918–1929)
 Mid-twentieth century baby boom, commonly called post-World War II baby boom: Years of duration vary, depending on the source.
 Echo Boomers (Millennials): (researchers and commentators use birth years typically ranging from the early 1980s to the mid 1990s) are mostly the children of baby boomers and a few members of the Silent Generation and Gen X.

See also 

 Agequake
 American social policy during the Second Red Scare
 Death rates in the 20th century
 Generation
 Population bottleneck
 Population growth
 Strauss–Howe generational theory

Notes for Japan

References

Further reading
THE NEXT FOUR DECADES – The Older Population in the United States: 2010 to 2050 U.S. Census Bureau
Population growth statistics from the Commission on Population Growth and the American Future (1972)

External links 
 Birth and other medical data from CDC
 Births per year from the CDC

Demographic economics
Natalism
Fertility